The 2021 Alabama State Hornets football team represented Alabama State University as a member of the East Division of the Southwestern Athletic Conference (SWAC) during 2021 NCAA Division I FCS football season. The Hornets were led by fourth-year head coach Donald Hill-Eley for the first seven games of the season before he was fired on November 1. The team's defensive coordinator, Travis Pearson, was named interim head coach for the remainder of the season. Alabama State compiled an overall record of 5–6 with a mark of 3–4 in conference play, tying for fourth place in the SWAC East Division. The team played home games at New ASU Stadium in Montgomery, Alabama.

Schedule

Game summaries

Miles

at Auburn

Bethune–Cookman

at Florida A&M

Arkansas–Pine Bluff

at Jackson State

vs. Alabama A&M

at Prairie View A&M

at Mississippi Valley State

Texas Southern

Tuskegee

References

Alabama State
Alabama State Hornets football seasons
Alabama State Hornets football